The Unionidae are a family of freshwater mussels, the largest in the order Unionida, the bivalve molluscs sometimes known as river mussels, or simply as unionids.

The range of distribution for this family is world-wide. It is at its most diverse in North America, with about 297 recognised taxa, but China and Southeast Asia also support very diverse faunas.

Freshwater mussels occupy a wide range of habitats, but most often occupy lotic waters, i.e. flowing water such as rivers, streams and creeks.

Origin and early diversification
The recent phylogenetic study reveals that the Unionidae most likely originated in Southeast and East Asia in the Jurassic, with the earliest expansions into North America and Africa (since the mid-Cretaceous) followed by the colonization of Europe and India (since the Paleocene).

Life history
Unionidae burrow into the substrate, with their posterior margins exposed. They pump water through the incurrent aperture, obtaining oxygen and food. They remove phytoplankton and zooplankton, as well as suspended bacteria, fungal spores, and dissolved organic matter.  Despite extensive laboratory studies,  which of these filtrates unionoids actually process remains uncertain. In high densities, they have the ability to influence water clarity  but filtration rates are dependent on water temperature, current velocity, and particle size and concentration.  In addition, gill morphology can determine particle size filtered, as well as the rate.

Reproduction
Unionidae are distinguished by a unique and complex lifecycle. Most unionids are of separate sex, although some species, such as Elliptio complanata, are known to be hermaphroditic.

The sperm is ejected from the mantle cavity through the male's excurrent aperture and taken into the female's mantle cavity through the incurrent aperture. Fertilised eggs move from the gonads to the gills (marsupia) where they further ripen and metamorph into glochidia, the first larval stage.  Mature glochidia are released by the female and then attach to the gills, fins, or skin of a host fish. A cyst is quickly formed around the glochidia, and they stay on the fish for several weeks or months before they fall off as juvenile mussels, which then bury themselves in the sediment.

Some of the species in the Unionidae, commonly known as pocketbook mussels, have evolved a remarkable reproductive strategy. The edge of the female's body that protrudes from the valves of the shell develops into an imitation of a small fish complete with markings and false eyes. This decoy moves in the current and attracts the attention of real fish. Some fish see the decoy as prey, while others see a conspecific, i.e. a member of their own species. Whatever they see, they approach for a closer look and the mussel releases huge numbers of larvae from her gills, dousing the inquisitive fish with her tiny, parasitic young. These glochidial larvae are drawn into the fish's gills, where they attach and trigger a tissue response that forms a small cyst in which the young mussel resides. It feeds by breaking down and digesting the tissue of the fish within the cyst.

Sex is determined by a region located on the mitochondrial DNA, the male open reading frame (M-ORF) and female open-reading frame (F-ORF). Hermaphroditic mussels lack these regions and contain a female-like open-reading frame dubbed hermaphroditic open-reading frame (H-ORF).  In many mussels, the hermaphroditic state is ancestral and the male sex evolved later.  This region of the mitochondria also may be responsible for the evolution of doubly uniparental inheritance  seen in freshwater mussels.

Taxonomy

Genera by taxonomic order 
The following classification is based on MolluscaBase and the MUSSEL Project database:

 Subfamily Ambleminae
 Tribe Lampsilini 
 Genus Epioblasma
 Genus  Lampsilis
 Genus Potamilus
 Genus Actinonaias
 Genus Cambarunio
 Genus Obovaria
 Genus Toxolasma
 Genus Medionidus
 Genus Ptychobranchus
 Genus Disconaias
 Genus Leaunio
 Genus Venustaconcha
 Genus Cyrtonaias
 Genus Hamiota
 Genus Sagittunio
 Genus Truncilla
 Genus Villosa
 Genus Arotonaias
 Genus Cyprogenia
 Genus Delphinonaias
 Genus Ortmanniana
 Genus Pachynaias
 Genus Atlanticoncha
 Genus Dromus
 Genus Ellipsaria
 Genus Friersonia
 Genus Glebula
 Genus Lemiox
 Genus Ligumia
 Genus Obliquaria
 Genus Paetulunio
 Tribe Pleurobemini
 Genus Elliptio
 Genus Pleurobema
 Genus Fusconaia
 Genus Plethobasus
 Genus Pleuronaia
 Genus Parvaspina
 Genus Elliptoideus
 Genus Eurynia
 Genus Hemistena
 Tribe Popenaiadini
 Genus Nephronaias
 Genus Psoronaias
 Genus Barynaias
 Genus Popenaias
 Genus Sphenonaias
 Genus Micronaias
 Genus Nephritica
 Genus Reticulatus
 Genus Martensnaias
 Tribe Quadrulini
 Genus Cyclonaias
 Genus Theliderma
 Genus Uniomerus
 Genus Quadrula
 Genus Megalonaias
 Genus Tritogonia
 Tribe Amblemini
 Genus Amblema
 Genus Regianaia
 Genus Plectomerus
 Subfamily Unioninae
 Tribe Anodontini
 Subtribe Alasmidontina
 Genus Alasmidonta
 Genus Lasmigona
 Genus Pyganodon
 Genus Utterbackiana
 Genus Strophitus
 Genus Utterbackia
 Genus Anodontoides
 Genus Arcidens
 Genus Pseudodontoideus
 Genus Pegias
 Genus Simpsonaias
 Subtribe Cristariina
 Genus Sinanodonta
 Genus Buldowskia
 Genus Cristaria
 Genus Anemina
 Genus Beringiana
 Genus Pletholophus
 Genus Simpsonella
 Genus Amuranodonta
 Subtribe Anodontina
 Genus Anodonta
 Genus Pseudanodonta
 Tribe Unionini
 Genus Unio
 Genus Nodularia
 Genus Aculamprotula
 Genus Acuticosta
 Genus Cuneopsis
 Genus Inversiunio
 Genus Pseudobaphia
 Genus Rhombuniopsis
 Genus Lepidodesma
 Genus Pseudocuneopsis
 Genus Schistodesmus
 Genus Arcuneopsis
 Genus Diaurora
 Genus Middendorffinaia
 Genus Protunio
 Tribe Lanceolariini
 Genus Lanceolaria
 Subfamily Gonideinae
 Tribe Pseudodontini
 Subtribe Pilsbryoconchina
 Genus Sundadontina
 Genus Monodontina
 Genus Pilsbryoconcha
 Genus Bineurus
 Genus Thaiconcha
 Genus Namkongnaia
 Genus Nyeinchanconcha
 Subtribe Pseudodontina
 Genus Pseudodon
 Tribe Contradentini
 Genus Lens
 Genus Yaukthwa
 Genus Physunio
 Genus Trapezoideus
 Genus Pressidens
 Genus Solenaia
 Tribe Lamprotulini
 Genus Lamprotula
 Genus Potomida
 Genus Schepmania
 Genus Discomya
 Genus Pronodularia
 Tribe Rectidentini
 Genus Hyriopsis
 Genus Ensidens
 Genus Ctenodesma
 Genus Elongaria
 Genus Khairuloconcha
 Genus Prohyriopsis
 Genus Rectidens
 Tribe Gonideni
 Genus Ptychorhynchus
 Genus Sinosolenaia
 Genus Inversidens
 Genus Leguminaia
 Genus Parvasolenaia
 Genus Gonidea
 Genus Koreosolenaia
 Genus Microcondylaea
 Genus Obovalis
 Genus Pseudodontopsis
 Tribe Chamberlainini
 Genus Sinohyriopsis
 Genus Chamberlainia
 Genus Caudiculatus
 Subfamily Parreysiinae
 Tribe Coelaturini
 Genus Coelatura
 Genus Nitia
 Genus Nyassunio
 Genus Prisodontopsis
 Genus Brazzaea
 Genus Grandidieria
 Genus Moncetia
 Genus Pseudospatha
 Tribe Indochinellini
 Genus Indonaia
 Genus Scabies
 Genus Radiatula
 Genus Harmandia
 Genus Indochinella
 Genus Scabiellus
 Genus Unionetta
 Tribe Lamellidentini
 Genus Lamellidens
 Genus Trapezidens
 Genus Arcidopsis
 Tribe Leoparreysiini
 Genus Leoparreysia
 Tribe Parreysiini
 Genus Parreysia
 Genus Balwantia
 Genus Haasodonta (subfamily incertae sedis)
 Genus Germainaia (subfamily incertae sedis)
 Subfamily Modellnaiinae
 Genus Modellnaia

Genera by alphabetic order and region 

Widespread
  Anodonta
  Potomida
  Unio
Africa
  Brazzaea
  Coelatura
  Germainaia
  Grandidieria
  Mweruella
  Nitia
  Nyassunio
  Prisodontopsis
  Pseudospatha
Central America and Mexico
  Arotonaias
  Barynaias
  Cyrtonaias
  Delphinonaias
  Disconaias
  Friersonia
  Martensnaias
  Micronaias
  Nephritica
  Nephronaias
  Pachynaias
  Popenaias
  Psoronaias
  Psorula
  Reticulatus
  Sphenonaias

Eastern Asia
  Aculamprotula 
  Acuticosta 
  Anemina 
  Arconaia 
 BineurusC. T. Simpson, 1900
  Caudiculatus 
  Chamberlainia 
  Contradens 
  Cristaria 
  Ctenodesma 
  Cuneopsis 
  Discomya 
  Elongaria 
  Ensidens 
  Harmandia 
  Hyriopsis 
  Inversidens 
  Inversiunio 
  Lamprotula 
  Lanceolaria 
  Lepidodesma 
  Modellnaia 
 Monodontina Conrad, 1853
  Nodularia 
  Oxynaia 
  Physunio 
  Pilsbryoconcha 
  Pressidens 
  Prohyriopsis 
  Pronodularia 
  Protunio 
  Pseudobaphia 
  Pseudodon 
  Ptychorhynchus 
  Rectidens 
  Rhombuniopsis 
  Scabies
 
  Schepmania 
  Schistodesmus 
  Simpsonella 
  Sinanodonta
 Solenaia
 Sundadontina Bolotov et al., 2020
 Thaiconcha Bolotov et al., 2020
  Unionetta
Europe
  Microcondylaea
  Pseudanodonta
India
  Arcidopsis
  Lamellidens
  Parreysia
  Radiatula
  Trapezoideus
  Yaukthwa
Middle East
  Leguminaia
  Pseudodontopsis
New Guinea
  Haasodonta
North America 
  Actinonaias
  Alasmidonta
  Amblema
  Anodontoides
  Arcidens
  Cyprogenia
  Dromus
  Ellipsaria
  Elliptio

  Elliptoideus
  Epioblasma
  Fusconaia
  Glebula
  Gonidea
  Hamiota
  Hemistena
  Lampsilis
  Lasmigona
  Lemiox
  Leptodea
  Ligumia
  Medionidus
  Megalonaias
  Obliquaria
  Obovaria
  Pegias
  Plectomerus
  Plethobasus
  Pleurobema
  Pleuronaia
  Potamilus
 Psoronaias Crosse & P. Fischer, 1894
  Ptychobranchus
  Pyganodon
  Quadrula
  Reginaia
  Rotundaria
  Simpsonaias
  Strophitus
  Theliderma
  Toxolasma
  Truncilla
  Uniomerus
  Utterbackia
  Venustaconcha
  Villosa

Fossilization and taphonomic implications
In large enough quantities, unionid shells can have enough of an impact on environmental conditions to affect the ability of organic remains in the local environment to fossilize. For example, in the Dinosaur Park Formation, fossil hadrosaur eggshell is rare because the breakdown of tannins from local coniferous vegetation would have caused the ancient waters to become acidic. Eggshell fragments are present in only two microfossil sites, both of which are dominated by the preserved shells of invertebrate life, including unionids. The slow dissolution of these shells releasing calcium carbonate into the water raised the water's pH high enough to prevent the eggshell fragments from dissolving before they could be fossilized.

References

External links

 Missouri State Unio Gallery
 Freshwater Mollusk Conservation Society
 Ohio State University: Division of Molluscs - Freshwater Mussel Collection - Unionidae
 Unionidae at The MUSSEL Project Web Site

 
Bivalve families
Extant Middle Jurassic first appearances